The International Communication Gazette is a peer-reviewed academic journal that publishes papers eight times a year in the field of communication studies. The editor-in-chief is Cees J. Hamelink (University of Amsterdam). It was established in 1955 and is published by SAGE Publications.

Abstracting and indexing 
The International Communication Gazette is abstracted and indexed in:
 Academic Premier
 Communication Abstracts
 Current Contents/Social and Behavioral Sciences
 Educational Research Abstracts Online
 Scopus
 Sociology of Education Abstracts

External links 
 

SAGE Publishing academic journals
English-language journals
Communication journals
Publications established in 1955